Nabi Kandi (also Romanized as Nabī Kandī; also known as Benī Kandī and Nabi Kand) is a village in Saruq Rural District, Takht-e Soleyman District, Takab County, West Azerbaijan Province, Iran. At the 2006 census, its population was 1,383, in 245 families.

References 

Populated places in Takab County